Bilingual is the sixth studio album by English synth-pop duo Pet Shop Boys, released in the United Kingdom on 2 September 1996 by Parlophone and in the United States on 10 September 1996 by Atlantic Records. The album reached number four on the UK Albums Chart, lower than their previous five studio albums which had all reached the top three. It yielded five successful singles, with three of them—"Before", "Se a vida é (That's the Way Life Is)" and "A Red Letter Day"—reaching the UK top 10; the fourth one, the English/Spanish-language composition "Single-Bilingual", peaked within the top 20.

Background and recording
Bilingual continues the heavily instrumented arrangements and backing vocals Pet Shop Boys began adding to their music with the album Very. As the title suggests, the songs on the album have worldwide influences, particularly from Latin America. After the release of their Very album, Pet Shop Boys toured South America and were influenced by the beats and rhythms associated with Latin American music. Three of the songs on the album have bilingual lyrics, mixing the English language with Spanish and Portuguese.

Bilingual was recorded in 1995-1996 at Bunk Junk & Genius, Sarm West and Sarm Hook End in London, at Axis and Bass Hit in New York City, and at the State House of Broadcasting and Sound Recording in Moscow. The album was produced by Pet Shop Boys, Chris Porter, Danny Tenaglia and K-Klass.

Release and promotion
Early in 1996, prior to the album's release, the Pet Shop Boys collaborated with David Bowie on the song "Hallo Spaceboy", which reached number 12 in the UK Singles Chart in February 1996.

In late 1995, the band ended their contract with the American branch of EMI and signed with Atlantic Records. A renewed marketing campaign was launched to promote the band in the United States via both radio airplay and club play. Already in May 1996, Atlantic supplied 200 clubs with import copies of "Before" ahead of the single's stateside release on 17 June. 

In their home UK, the single "Se a vida é (That's the Way Life Is)" gained a great deal of radio airplay and peaked at number eight on the UK chart in late August 1996. Like with the lead single "Before", a promotional video was used instead of a live performance on Top of the Pops. 

In late 1996 the song "Up Against It" became a radio hit in Sweden and some other countries but never had a release as a CD single.

On 15 December 1996, Tennant appeared with Suede at the Roundhouse in London, singing "Saturday Night" as a duet with Suede's lead singer Brett Anderson. The live recording, together with "Rent" Tennant performed on the same evening accompanied by Suede, would later be released as B-sides to Suede's single "Filmstar". 

By February 1997, the album is said to have sold 1.5 million copies worldwide.  

In 1997, Pet Shop Boys decided to perform a series of concerts at the Savoy Theatre in London. To promote the concerts they released a cover version of "Somewhere" from West Side Story and called their residency "Pet Shop Boys Somewhere". The single reached the UK top 10 and Bilingual was re-released in a "Special Edition", including the new single and a bonus CD of remixes and B-sides.

In 2001, Pet Shop Boys reissued their first six studio albums; Bilingual was re-released as Bilingual/Further Listening 1995–1997. The reissue was not only digitally remastered, but included a second disc of B-sides and previously unreleased material from around the time of the album's original release.

Yet another re-release followed on 9 February 2009, under the title of Bilingual: Remastered. This version contains only the 12 tracks of the original. With the 2009 re-release, the 2001 double-disc re-release was discontinued.

Singles
"Before" was released on 22 April 1996 as the lead single from Bilingual. It was co-produced with Danny Tenaglia and featured Barbara Tucker, Carole Sylvan and Karen Bernod on backing vocals. The B-sides were "Hit and Miss", "The Truck Driver and His Mate" and the 1995 version of "In the Night".

In the United States, Atlantic's gay marketing division promoted "Before" with a series of parties at gay nightclubs in cities where the band had previous commercial success. Several hundred clubs received import promotional 12" singles and the subsequent domestic 12" and CD maxi-single releases were focused entirely on remixes. Promotion was also targeted at Top 40, alternative, and college radio formats.

The album's second single, "Se a vida é (That's the Way Life Is)", was co-produced with Chris Porter and featured drums by Glasgow group SheBoom. Remixes were done by Mark Picchiotti, Deep Dish and Pink Noise. The B-sides were "Betrayed" and "How I Learned to Hate Rock 'n' Roll". The video for the song was shot by Bruce Weber and set mainly in a water park located in south Florida. Featured youthful models frolicking in the water, the video evoked memories of the 1990 single "Being Boring". "Se a vida é" spent six weeks in the UK top 40 in autumn 1996. It was eventually released in the US in April 1997 as a double A-side single with "To Step Aside". To promote the package, thirteen mixes of "To Step Aside" were commissioned, most of them released promotionally only and unreleased in the UK. "To Step Aside" was nominated for a Grammy Award for Best Dance Recording in 1998.

The third single to be released was "Single". It was renamed "Single-Bilingual" because Everything but the Girl had released a different single also called "Single" around the same time. Produced by Pet Shop Boys with drums by SheBoom, the single included remixes of "Single-Bilingual" and a new mix of "Discoteca". The B-sides were "Confidential (Demo for Tina)" and "The Calm Before the Storm".

A new version of "A Red Letter Day", featuring additional production by Steve Rodway, was released as the fourth single from Bilingual. It features Barbara Tucker, Carole Sylvan and Karen Bernod on backing vocals along with the Choral Academy of Moscow. The B-sides were "The Boy Who Couldn't Keep His Clothes On" and "Delusions of Grandeur". It was also the only Top of the Pops studio performance of any single released from Bilingual. The previous singles had been promoted on the hit music show by the official videos. The performance of "A Red Letter Day" in March 1997 was the first studio performance by Neil and Chris as a duo since "Paninaro 95" in July 1995, and since appearing alongside David Bowie for "Hallo Spaceboy" in February 1996.

During this era, an additional single not part of the original Bilingual package, "Somewhere", was released to promote the duo's residency at the Savoy Theatre in London and to promote a repackage of Bilingual. A Special performance of "Somewhere" was recorded at the Savoy Theatre for Top of the Pops in the UK. In the US it was released as a double A-side with "A Red Letter Day". For the UK release, the B-sides were "Disco Potential" and "The View from Your Balcony".

Track listing

Notes
 "It Always Comes as a Surprise" contains a sample of Astrud Gilberto from "Corcovado (Quiet Nights of Quiet Stars)" by Stan Getz.
 "Metamorphosis" contains the line "somebody spoke and I went into a dream" which is lifted from The Beatles "A Day in the Life".

Special edition (1997)

2001 reissue bonus disc: Further Listening 1995–1997
"Paninaro '95" – 4:11
"In the Night" (1995) – 4:18
"The Truck-Driver and His Mate" – 3:33
"Hit and Miss" – 4:07
"How I Learned to Hate Rock 'n' Roll" – 4:38
"Betrayed" – 5:20
"Delusions of Grandeur" – 5:04
"Discoteca" (single version) – 5:14 *
"The Calm Before the Storm" – 2:48
"Discoteca" (new version) – 3:47
"The Boy Who Couldn't Keep His Clothes On" (Danny Tenaglia international club mix) – 6:09 **
"A Red Letter Day" (expanded single version) – 5:36 *
"The View from Your Balcony" – 3:44
"Disco Potential" – 4:07
"Somewhere" (extended mix) – 10:55

(*) Previously unreleased.
(**) The same version featured on the limited edition of Bilingual.

Personnel
Credits adapted from the liner notes of Bilingual.

Pet Shop Boys
 Neil Tennant
 Chris Lowe

Additional musicians

 Pete Gleadall – programming 
 SheBoom – drums, percussion ; additional drums, percussion 
 Robin Jones – additional percussion ; percussion 
 Davide Giovanni – additional vocals 
 Joseph De Jesus – additional vocals 
 Weston Foster – additional vocals 
 Lino Rocha – additional vocals 
 Sylvia Mason-James – vocals 
 Simon Cotsworth – programming 
 Ritchie Birkett – keyboards 
 Trevor Henry/Ignorants – scratching, additional keyboards 
 Kevin Robinson – brass 
 Bud Beadle – brass 
 Fayyaz Virji – brass 
 Mike Innes – brass 
 Noel Langley – brass 
 Richard Sidell – brass 
 Andy Hamilton – brass ; saxophone 
 J.J. Belle – guitar 
 Chris Cameron – additional keyboards ; string arrangement, string conducting 
 Hugh Burns – guitar 
 Katie Kissoon – additional vocals 
 The Choral Academy of Moscow – choir 
 Victor Popov – choir direction 
 Graeme Perkins – choir coordination 
 Alyosha Zolotukhin – choir arrangement 
 Barbara Tucker – additional vocals 
 Karen Bernod – additional vocals 
 Carole Sylvan – additional vocals 
 Johnny Marr – guitar, additional vocals 
 Greg Bone – guitar 
 Andy Duncan – drums, percussion 
 Danny Tenaglia – drum programming 
 Louie "Balo" Guzman – drum programming 
 Peter Daou – keyboards 
 Phil Pagano – programming 
 Eddie Montilla – additional keyboards 

Technical

 Pet Shop Boys – production
 Bob Kraushaar – engineering ; mixing 
 Paul Roberts – production 
 Andy Williams – production 
 Simon Cotsworth – engineering 
 Chris Porter – production, recording ; mixing 
 Tatyana Vinnitskaya – choir recording 
 Danny Tenaglia – production 
 Dana Vlcek – recording, mix engineering 
 Rob Rives – engineering assistance 
 Rich Lowe – engineering 
 Doug DeAngelis – mix engineering 
 Claire Tonkinson – recording assistance
 Andrew Green – recording assistance
 Tom Elmhirst – recording assistance

Artwork
 Mark Farrow Design – sleeve
 Pet Shop Boys – sleeve
 Chris Heath – photography
 José Cea – photography

Further Listening 1995–1997
Credits adapted from the liner notes of Bilingual/Further Listening 1995–1997.

Additional musicians
 Pete Gleadall – programming 
 Oli Savill – percussion 
 Lilliana Chacian – percussion 
 Sylvia Mason-James – additional vocals 
 SheBoom – drums, percussion 
 Robin Jones – additional percussion 
 Katie Kissoon – additional vocals 
 Davide Giovanni – additional vocals 
 Joseph De Jesus – additional vocals 
 Weston Foster – additional vocals 
 Lino Rocha – additional vocals 
 Danny Tenaglia – drum programming 
 Louie "Balo" Guzman – drum programming 
 Peter Daou – keyboards 
 Vanessa Ichak – Banji girl vocals 
 The Choral Academy of Moscow – choir 
 Victor Popov – choir direction 
 Graeme Perkins – choir coordination 
 Alyosha Zolotukhin – choir arrangement 
 Richard Niles – orchestra arrangement, orchestra conducting 

Technical
 Pet Shop Boys – production
 Bob Kraushaar – engineering ; mixing 
 Pete Gleadall – engineering 
 Pete Schwier – engineering, mixing 
 Danny Tenaglia – production 
 Doug DeAngelis – mix engineering 
 Steve Rodway – additional production 
 Mike "Spike" Drake – mixing 
 Tatyana Vinnitskaya – choir recording 
 Throusers Enthusiasts – additional production 
 Steve Price – orchestra recording 
 Claire Tonkinson – recording assistance
 Andrew Green – recording assistance
 Tom Elmhirst – recording assistance
 Tim Young – remastering

The sampled lines in "Electricity" were taken from the 1942 film My Gal Sal and were spoken by Rita Hayworth. The film happened to be playing on television while the track was being recorded, and was not publicly identified until 2019.

Charts

Weekly charts

Year-end charts

Certifications and sales

Release history

References

1996 albums
Parlophone albums
Pet Shop Boys albums